Femi Fadugba (born 1987)  is a British writer and physicist based in London. His first book, The Upper World, was published by Penguin Random House in 2021. It was turned into a film by Netflix, starring Daniel Kaluuya.

Early life and education 
Fadugba was born in Togo during a civil war. His father was an interpreter for the United Nations. He spent his childhood in the United States and moved to England at the age of nine, where he attended a boarding school in Somerset. Fadugba was encouraged by his school caretaker to pursue a career in physics. In an interview with The Guardian, Fadugba explained that at the age of 11 his caretaker gave him Quantum Physics for Dummies.

Faduga completed a master's degree in materials science at St. Catherine's College, University of Oxford, where he was awarded the Rolls-Royce Armourers and Brasiers' Company Prize. His third year project specialised in quantum computing. He moved to the University of Pennsylvania for graduate studies, where he worked toward a Master of Public Administration as a Thouron Scholar.

Career 
Fadugba returned to the United Kingdom, where he worked in a solar finance company. In 2011 he was selected by the Rare Rising Stars competition as the "UK’s Best Black Student".

Fadugba's book, The Upper World, combines the everyday life of young people living in Peckham, South London, with time travel and quantum physics. He was motivated to write it after his friends became increasingly curious about the mysteries and miracles of physics. Fadugba has described physics as a combination of maths and metaphors. The Guardian described The Upper World as a "uniquely thrilling, heart-wrenching young adult novel". After a 15-way auction, the book was published by Penguin Random House in August 2021.

Almost immediately after Fadugba sent the manuscript to the publishers, it was leaked to Hollywood. Faduba was approached by Netflix, Monkeypaw Productions and Plan B Entertainment for the film rights. The rights were won by Netflix, and the film will be produced by and star Daniel Kaluuya.

Personal life 
Fadugba is married to an American.

References 

1987 births
Alumni of the University of Oxford
British materials scientists
British science fiction writers
Living people
Togolese emigrants to the United Kingdom
University of Pennsylvania alumni